Robert McKim may refer to:

Robert McKim (actor) (1886–1927), American actor
Robert McKim (Ontario politician) (1828–1900), Ontario farmer and political figure
Robert McKim (philosopher) (born 1952), philosopher of religion
Robert McKim (Wyoming politician) (1946–2018), American politician, member of the Wyoming House of Representatives